Suryodayam is a 1999 Tamil-language action film directed by L. V. Aadhavan. The film stars Vijayashanti and Rahman, with Vijayakumar, Anusha, Nizhalgal Ravi, Viswajith, Hariraj, Charle, and Kumaresan playing supporting roles. It was released on 7 October 1999.

Plot

Bala is a singer in a musical ensemble with his friends Ajith; Ajith's girlfriend Amritha; Nambi, and Wilson. They are not enough popular to get decent assignments. One day, they get the opportunity to sing for a grand function and they have an outstanding performance there. The famous Indian concert organizer J. R. appreciates their performance and gives them an opportunity to perform in Sri Lanka.

In the meantime, many cities of India experience terrorist incidents. The terrorists used remote-controlled cars "detonator" to commit those attacks. The CBI officer Indra is charged to dismantle the terrorist group. She finally captures Dawood, the leader of the terrorist group. However, he later manages to escape from jail and lands in Takistan, a dangerous and corrupt country.

J. R. has also another face: he is an international arms dealer and sells weapons to terrorists. J. R. with Kannan and his friends move to Takistan to perform in a concert. There, J. R. meets the terrorist Dawood, who is sought by the CBI. J. R. thinks that Dawood's presence may lure the CBI so J. R.'s partner Malik, a Takistan's secret agent, killed Dawood. J. R. then plans to kill the Indian scientist Kaladharan who is on the brink of finding a solution to disable the remote-controlled cars. When Bala learns of the matter, he immediately informs his friends by phone, but J. R. sees him, and his henchmen brutally murder Bala. Ajith, Nambi, and Wilson seek justice for their late friend Bala. They inform Indra about J. R.'s illegal activities. What transpires next forms the rest of the story.

Cast

Vijayashanti as Indra
Rahman as Bala
Vijayakumar as J. R.
Anusha as Amritha
Nizhalgal Ravi as Kaladharan
Viswajith as Dawood
Hariraj as Ajith
Charle as Nambi
Kumaresan as Wilson
Prathapachandran as Chief Minister
Bakhtiyar as Malik
Kumarimuthu
Peketi Sivaram
Sabeetha Perera
Jaguar Thangam as Vikram
Delhi Kannan
Pandurangam
Ulmas
Habiba
Weerasinghe Ranatunga
Sanuja Bibili
B. H. Abdul Hameed as himself

Production
The film began production in 1994 titled  Isai Payanam and featured Rahman, Anusha and Sri Lankan actress Sabeetha Perera. Vijayashanti joined the cast later on, and the film was retitled to Suryodayam. The film was extensively shot across Uzbekistan and Sri Lanka, as well as India. It became the first Indian film to be shot in Uzbekistan.

After seventy five percent of the shoot was over, Athavan was replaced as director by Pandiyan Arivali, who had earlier made Avathara Purushan (1996). He removed twenty five percent of the shot scenes, and completed the film thereafter.

Soundtrack

The film score and the soundtrack were composed by Gnani. The soundtrack, released in 1999, features 4 tracks with lyrics written by Kovi Kannan.

Release
A reviewer from Lollu Express gave the film a negative review, stating the plot seemed like "a mixture of five movies". The film received a mixed review from a critic from Tamilcinema.com.

In October 1999, the film was dubbed and released in Telugu as Desam Kosam by producer Maddi Narayana under the Sri Krishnarjuna Films banner.

References

1999 films
1990s Tamil-language films
Indian action films
Films about organised crime in India
Films about terrorism in India
Films shot in Sri Lanka
Films shot in Uzbekistan
Films set in Asia
1999 action films